Tutli-ye Sofla (also Romanized as Tūtlī-ye Soflá and Tūtlī Soflá; also known as Tūtlī, Tūtlī-ye Pā’īn, and Āshāqī Tūtlī) is a village in Jargalan Rural District, Raz and Jargalan District, Bojnord County, North Khorasan Province, Iran. At the 2006 census, its population was 449, in 100 families.

References 

Populated places in Bojnord County